State Route 89 (SR 89) is a primary state highway in the U.S. state of Virginia.  The state highway runs  from the North Carolina state line, where the highway continues as North Carolina Highway 89 (NC 89), north to U.S. Route 58 (US 58) and US 221 in Galax.

Route description

SR 89 begins at the North Carolina state line a short distance south of Low Gap, where the highway crosses the Eastern Continental Divide.  The highway continues south as NC 89, which descends the Blue Ridge Mountains to the community of Lowgap in the valley of the Fisher River.  After entering the watershed of the New River, SR 89 crosses the West Fork of Chestnut Creek and has an interchange with the Blue Ridge Parkway, which provides access to the Blue Ridge Music Center to the east.  North of the parkway, the state highway intersects SR 613 (Edmonds Road), which leads west to Big Spring Bog Natural Area Preserve.  SR 89 heads straight north as Skyline Highway to McCarmant Hill, where the highway leaves Grayson County and enters the independent city of Galax as Main Street.  The state highway crosses Chestnut Creek twice before meeting the western end of SR 97 (Pipers Gap Road).  SR 89 heads through downtown Galax before reaching its northern terminus at US 58 and US 221 (Stuart Drive).

History
The whole route was added to the state highway system in 1928 as State Route 117. It was renumbered State Route 96 in the 1933 renumbering, and in the 1940 renumbering it was renumbered State Route 89 to match North Carolina Highway 89.

Major intersections

VA 89 Truck

Virginia State Route 89 Truck in Galax, Virginia is Meadow Street from SR 89, one block north of the western terminus of SR 97 to US 58/US 221. It runs entirely along the east bank of Chestnut Creek.

References

External links

Virginia Highways Project: VA 89

089
State Route 089
State Route 089
1940 establishments in Virginia